Withem is a surname. Notable people with the surname include:

Ron Withem (1946–2020), American politician
Shannon Withem (born 1972), American baseball player